Prince Ali Stadium is a multi-purpose stadium in Mafraq, Jordan. It is currently used mostly for football matches. The stadium holds 3,500 people.

External links
ملعب المفرق – Al-Mafraq Field 

Football venues in Jordan
Multi-purpose stadiums in Jordan